Dangerfield is a British television medical drama series, first broadcast on BBC One, which described the activities of small-town doctor and police surgeon Paul Dangerfield, played by Nigel Le Vaillant. The series places particular emphasis on Dangerfield's constant struggle to manage the conflicting demands of his two jobs, to come to terms with the death of his wife Celia in a car accident a few years earlier, and to bring up his two initially teenaged, but later grown up, children, Alison and Marty. Six series of the programme were produced, broadcasting from 27 January 1995 until 19 November 1999. After Le Vaillant left the role in 1997, Dr. Jonathan Paige, played by Nigel Havers, became the new central character, after previously appearing in the final two episodes of Le Vaillant's tenure. The BBC decided to end the series in November 1999 when Havers announced his decision to quit. The BBC felt viewers would not find the series credible if the main character was changed for a second time.

The show, like a number of other BBC dramas of the 1980s and 1990s, also featured a number of borderline fantasy episodes. These included "Tricks", "Angel" and "Haunted". The TV trailers for Dangerfield were heavily parodied by The Fast Show, in which the character was called Monkfish and would appear as a tough uncompromising Doctor, Policeman, vet and even as an interior designer – with titles mixed in with other BBC shows of the time. The show was mainly filmed in Warwick, Warwickshire, with some scenes being filmed in neighbouring Leamington Spa. The first two series have since been released on DVD.
Dangerfield is regularly shown on UKTV Channels – Alibi & Drama

Cast
 Nigel Le Vaillant as Dr. Paul Dangerfield (Series 1–4)
 Nigel Havers as Dr. Jonathan Paige (Guest Series 4; Series 5–6)
 Nadim Sawalha as Dr. Shaaban Hamada (Series 1–5)
 Bill Wallis as Dr. Nick McKenzie (Series 1–5)
 Amanda Redman as Dr. Joanna Stevens (Series 1–2)
 Hilary Lyon as Dr. Roz Parker (Series 2)
 Fiona Victory as Dr. Annie Robbins (Series 3–4)
 George Irving as DI Ken Jackson (Series 1–2)
 Michael Melia as DI Frank Dagley (Series 3–4)
 Jane Gurnett as DI Gillian Kramer (Series 5–6)
 Tracy Gillman as DC Nicky Green (Series 1–2)
 Nicola Cowper as DS Helen Diamond (Series 3–6)
 Ian Gain as DC Gary Monk (Series 5–6)
 Idris Elba as DC Matt Gregory (Series 6)
 Roderick Smith as Sgt. Keith Lardner (Series 1–6)
 Mo Sesay as PC Nigel Spenser (Series 1–2)
 Eleanor Martin as PC Georgie Cudworth (Series 1–4)
 Julian Kay as PC Tom Allen (Series 5–6)
 Lisa Faulkner as Alison Dangerfield (Series 1–2)
 Tamzin Malleson as Alison Dangerfield (Series 3–4)
 Sean Maguire as Marty Dangerfield (Series 1–2)
 Tim Vincent as Marty Dangerfield (Series 3–4)
 Julian Kerridge as Ben Wright (Series 2)
 Jemma Green as Anna (Series 3)
 Catherine Terris as Julia Caxton (Series 1–2)
 Kim Vithana as Kate Durrani (Series 1)
 Jacquetta May as Liz Moss (Series 3)
 Marcia Warren as Angela Wakefield (Series 3–5)
 Hugh Dancy as Charlie Paige (Series 5–6)
 Lynsey Baxter as Beth Saunders (Series 5)
 Frances White as Molly Cramer (Series 5–6)
 Hilary Maclean as Debby Miller (Series 6)

A number of famous actors appeared as guest stars: they included Keith Allen, Robin Ellis, Edward Hardwicke, Anita Dobson, Brigit Forsyth, Brendan Coyle, Richard Hawley, Michael Elphick, Rachel Davies, Helen Baxendale, David Daker, Stephen Moore, Roberta Taylor, Corin Redgrave, Hilda Braid, Jean Marsh, Denys Hawthorne, John Duttine, Owen Teale, Andrew Lancel, Jim Carter, Mary Healey, Tom Bell, Joe McGann, Haydn Gwynne, Simon Williams, Michelle Holmes, Phyllida Law, Miles Anderson, Robert Pugh, Elizabeth Bennett, Roger Brierley, Colin Baker and Richard Lumsden. Some future stars who also appeared included Kevin Bishop, Adrian Bower, Hannah Waterman, Daniel Ryan and Matty Craig. In addition, Alan Towers, the former main anchor on the local news programme Midlands Today, appeared as a local television reporter in a few episodes.

Episodes

Series 1 (1995)

Series 2 (1995)

Series 3 (1996)

Series 4 (1997)

Series 5 (1998)
This was the first series to feature Nigel Havers as the primary character, Dr. Jonathan Paige. Jane Gurnett was similarly introduced as the new main investigating officer in the series, D.I. Gillian Kramer. Many of the cast from the two previous series were retained; with the exception of Michael Melia, Tim Vincent, Tamzin Malleson and Fiona Victory. This series was broadcast at 9:35pm on Fridays. Viewing figures for this series was strong enough for a sixth series to be commissioned.

Series 6 (1999)

DVD releases

The first two series were released on DVD in the United Kingdom. The entire 6 series were released on DVD in Germany. As common with many releases of British series in Europe the DVDs contain the original (English) soundtrack but the menu, subtitles and packaging are in German. It is unclear whether the rest of the series will get a DVD release in the United Kingdom. Both releases are encoded Region 2 discs.

There has also been an Australian release of Series 1 and 2; these are encoded Region 4.

References

External links

1995 British television series debuts
1999 British television series endings
1990s British drama television series
1990s British medical television series
BBC television dramas
BBC Birmingham productions
English-language television shows
Television shows set in Warwickshire
Television series by BBC Studios